The 2003 U.S. Women's Open was the 58th U.S. Women's Open, held July 3–7 at the Witch Hollow course of Pumpkin Ridge Golf Club near North Plains, Oregon, northwest of Portland.

Hilary Lunke won her only major (and only LPGA) title in an 18-hole Monday playoff over Angela Stanford and Kelly Robbins, and became the first qualifier to win the championship. The three Americans finished the fourth round at 283 (−1), one stroke ahead of two-time champion Annika Sörenstam, who bogeyed the par-5 72nd hole after putting her tee shot in the fairway.  The last playoff was five years earlier in 1998 and it had been sixteen years  since three players were involved. In the playoff round, all three players birdied the final (90th) hole, and Lunke clinched the title by one stroke over Stanford.

This was the second U.S. Women's Open at the Witch Hollow course; it hosted six years earlier in 1997, won by Alison Nicholas. It was also the site of the U.S. Amateur in 1996, the third straight victory by 20-year-old Tiger Woods in his final competition as an amateur.

Course layout
Witch Hollow Course

Source:

Past champions in the field

Made the cut

Missed the cut

Round summaries

First round
Thursday, July 3, 2003

Source:

Second round
Friday, July 4, 2003

Source:

Third round
Saturday, July 5, 2003

Source:

Final round
Sunday, July 6, 2003

Source:

Scorecard

Source:

Playoff 
Monday, July 7, 2003

Source:

Scorecard

Source:

References

External links

Golf Observer final leaderboard
U.S. Women's Open Golf Championship

U.S. Women's Open
Golf in Oregon
Sports competitions in Oregon
U.S. Women's Open
U.S. Women's Open
U.S. Women's Open
U.S. Women's Open
Women's sports in Oregon